Gaver is a surname. Notable people with the surname include:

Bill Gaver, American academic
John M. Gaver, Jr. (1940–2002), American thoroughbred racehorse trainer, son of John Sr.
John M. Gaver, Sr. (1900–1982), American thoroughbred racehorse trainer
Mary Virginia Gaver (1906–1991), American librarian